The W-League, the top women's soccer league in Australia, hands out a number of annual awards.

Current awards

Julie Dolan Medal

The medal is awarded annually to the player voted to be the best player in the W-League, the top women's football (soccer) league in Australia. The award is named after former Matildas Captain and football administrator Julie Dolan. The format was changed for the 2015–16 season, with a panel featuring former players, media, referees and technical staff, who voted on each regular-season match.   The following table contains only the winners of the medal during the W-League era. The award was also presented for the best player in the previous Women's National Soccer League prior to the W-League.

Young Footballer of the Year

Golden Boot

Goalkeeper of the Year (Golden Glove)

Goal of the Year

Coach of the Year

Referee of the Year

Fair Play Award

Previous awards

FMA Player of the Year

Player's Player of the Year

See also

W-League records and statistics

References

External links
 

Awards established in 2008
A-League Women trophies and awards
Awards
Lists of women's association football players
Association football player non-biographical articles